Spatial analysis software is software written to enable and facilitate spatial analysis. Currently, there are several packages, both free software and proprietary software, which cover most of the spatial data infrastructure stack.

Packages

See also
 Comparison of GIS software
 Geographic information System
 Spatial analysis
 Spatial network analysis software

References

Sources
 Rey, S. J. Show me the code: Spatial Analysis and Open Source

External links 
Further resources may be found in the following links:
 AI GEOSTATS: Geostatistics and spatial statistics freeware
 GeoDa Center Site of software for Geospatial analysis and computation
 OSGeo: The Open Source Geospatial Foundation
 opensourcegis.org
 R-Geo
 spatialanalysisonline.com
 Map Comparison Kit

Spatial Analysis Software
Geographic information systems